Ekspress-103 ( meaning Express-103) is a Russian communications satellite which was launched in 2020. Part of the Ekspress series of geostationary communications satellites, it is owned and operated by the RSCC Space Communications.

Satellite description 
Thales Alenia Space, constructed Ekspress-103 payload, and ISS Reshetnev constructed the satellite bus which was based on the Ekspress-1000N. The satellite carried 37 transponders: 16 operating in the C-band of the electromagnetic spectrum, 20 in the Ku-band and 1 in the L-band.

Mission 
The satellite is designed to provide TV and radio broadcasting services, data transmission, multimedia services, telephony, and mobile communications.

Launch 
Ekspress-103 was originally to be launched in 2018, but was delayed to 2020. It used a Proton-M / Briz-M launch vehicle to be placed in a supersynchronous geostationary transfer orbit (16,581 km x 5,4811 km x 0.64°) as was Ekspress-80 (16,593 km x 54,812 km x 0.62°).

Mission 
The Ekspress-103 satellite entered in service at orbital position 96.5° East on 25 March 2021, where it replaced Ekspress-AM33.

See also 

 2020 in spaceflight

References 

Ekspress satellites
Spacecraft launched in 2020
Satellites using the Ekspress bus
2020 in Russia